The American elm cultivar Ulmus americana 'Brandon' was raised by Lacombe Nurseries  Lacombe, Alberta, Canada, before 1969; it may be synonymous with another cultivar from the same source known as 'Patmore', selected and raised by R. H. Patmore from a native tree in Brandon, Manitoba.

Description
'Brandon' (or 'Patmore') differs from most American Elms in possessing a smaller, more compact form bearing coarsely-toothed foliage. The tree performed very well in government trials in Alberta, Canada, emerging as 'Highly Recommended'.

Pests and diseases
'Brandon' is highly susceptible to Dutch Elm Disease. The species as a whole is susceptible to Elm Yellows; it is also moderately preferred for feeding and reproduction by the adult Elm Leaf Beetle Xanthogaleruca luteola, and highly preferred for feeding by the Japanese Beetle Popillia japonica  in the United States.
U. americana is also the most susceptible of all the elms to verticillium wilt.

Cultivation
The tree remains common across the Prairie Provinces (Alberta is free of Dutch elm disease and other malaises typical of the American Elm). 'Brandon' also remains in cultivation in the city of Bozeman, Montana, where it is prized as an amenity tree by the Forestry Division,  and in California.  
The tree is not known to have been introduced to Europe or Australasia.

Synonymy
'Brandon Ascending': Proc. 27th Ann. Mtg. Western Canad. Soc. Hort., Manitoba, 1971, as Brandon Ascending, from Patmore Nurseries, Brandon, Manitoba.
?'Patmore': Anon.

Accessions
None known.

Nurseries
Foothills Nurseries, California, US.
Jeffries Nurseries, Portage la Prairie Manitoba, Canada
Sun Valley Garden Centre, Eden Prairie, Minnesota, US

References

External links
Bevacqua, K. J. Dutch elm resistant cultivars.

American elm cultivar
Ulmus articles with images